Wilfred Oluwafemi Onyedinma (born 24 November 1996) is a Nigerian professional footballer who plays as a midfielder for Championship club Luton Town.

Early life
Onyedinma was born in Lagos, Nigeria and his parents moved the family to England, along with his brother and two sisters, when Fred was aged three. He grew up in Greenwich, Plumstead and Woolwich and attended Corelli College in Kidbrooke. He played local football representing Blackheath district as a youngster alongside Alex Iwobi, Joe Gomez and Kasey Palmer, before he was spotted by Millwall scout and former player Andy Massey, and subsequently signed for the club at the age of twelve.

Career

Early career
Onyedinma made his senior debut for Millwall on 4 January 2014 in the FA Cup against Southend United. He came on as a 62nd-minute substitute for Richard Chaplow as Millwall lost 4–1. He later made his full debut against Charlton Athletic and was named Man of the Match.

Wycombe Wanderers
On 27 November 2014, Onyedinma joined League Two side, Wycombe Wanderers on a loan deal, lasting until January 2015.  On 31 December 2014, Onyedinma's loan spell at Wycombe Wanderers was extended to the end of the 2014–15 season as part of the Paris Cowan-Hall transfer deal.

On 30 August 2018, Onyedinma rejoined Wycombe Wanderers – this time in League One – on loan until 1 January 2019. After returning to Millwall in January 2019 for the remainder of the season Onyedinma found first team opportunities hard to come by despite praise for his performances in training from manager Neil Harris.

On 30 July 2019 it was confirmed that Onyedinma would be returning to Wycombe for a third time, this time on a permanent 3 year deal for an undisclosed fee.

On 6 July 2020, Onyedinma scored twice in the second leg of Wycombe's EFL League One semi-final match against Fleetwood Town to secure a 2–2 draw and a 6–3 win on aggregate. In the final against Oxford United on 13 July, Onyedinma won the penalty that led to Wycombe's match-winning goal, securing promotion to the Championship for the first time in the club's history.

Luton Town
Onyedinma signed for Luton Town for an undisclosed fee on 25 May 2021. He scored and assisted a further two goals on his debut for the club, a 3–0 victory over Peterborough on 7 August 2021.

Career statistics

Honours
Millwall
EFL League One play-offs: 2017

Wycombe Wanderers
EFL League One play-offs: 2020

References

External links
 Soccerbase Profile.
 Millwall profile.

1996 births
Living people
Footballers from Greater London
Residents of Lagos
Nigerian footballers
Association football midfielders
Millwall F.C. players
Wycombe Wanderers F.C. players
Luton Town F.C. players
English Football League players